Maryada was a Bengali drama film directed by Digambar Chattopadhyay. This movie was released on 15 December 1950 in the banner of Bhabani Kalamandir Limited. This is the third and first movie of legendary Bengali actor Uttam Kumar and Bibhu Bhattacharya appeared respectively. In this movie Uttam Kumar leap on a song for the first time in his career.

Plot

Cast
 Uttam Kumar
 Pahari Sanyal
 Kamal Mitra
 Jiben Bose
 Nripati Chattopadhyay
 Nabadwip Haldar
 Bibhu Bhattacharya
 Smriti Biswas
 Haridhan Mukhopadhyay
 Santosh Sinha
 Ashu Bose

Soundtrack

References

External links
 

1950 films
Bengali-language Indian films
1950 drama films
1950s Bengali-language films
Indian drama films
Indian black-and-white films